Casa Coco is a 2022 Dutch comedy film directed by Bob Wilbers. The film won the Golden Film award after having sold 100,000 tickets. It was the twelfth best visited Dutch film of 2022 with just over 113,000 visitors.

Gerard Cox, Joke Bruijs and Katja Schuurman are among the cast of the film. Principal photography began in February 2021 in Bonaire.

References

External links 
 

2022 films
2020s Dutch-language films
Films shot in Bonaire
Films set in Bonaire
Films directed by Bob Wilbers
Dutch comedy films
2022 comedy films